Evaristo Viñuales Larroy (22 June 1913 – 1 April 1939) was an Aragonese teacher and anarchist.

Biography
Evaristo Viñuales Larroy was born into an educated family: his father and aunt, Evaristo and Gregoria Viñuales Escartín, were both teachers at the Escuela Normal of Huesca. After the early death of his father on 15 August 1928, the young Evaristo completed his exams to become a teacher, following the family tradition. His fellow students, including  and Miguel Chueca Cuartero, were all educated by the anarcho-syndicalist teacher Ramón Acín Aquilué.

In 1931, with the proclamation of the Second Spanish Republic, he joined the National Confederation of Labor (CNT). He was arrested several times for his syndicalist activities: in February 1932, in April 1933, during the general strike of November 1933, and at the end of 1934, when he was sentenced to two years in prison in Alcalá de Henares. After the 1936 Spanish general election, Viñuales Larroy was paroled and returned to work immediately. Among the magazine's contributors were Josep Peirats Valls, Federica Montseny, Amparo Poch y Gascón, Alexander Schapiro and Emma Goldman.

In July 1937, as secretary of the Regional Committee of Anarchist Groups of Aragon, he took part in the peninsular meeting of the Iberian Anarchist Federation. During this period, he collaborated with libertarian newspapers Cultura y Acción, Titán and Nuevo Aragón.

Appointed captain, he fought in the column until the end of the war. When defeat was evident, with nationalist troops advancing and Republican troops in total retreat, Viñuales and Cavero decided that they would not end up at the hands of the fascists. Both committed suicide together on 1 April 1939, shooting themselves while shaking hands. "This is our last protest against fascism," Evaristo said before pulling the trigger.

Evaristo Viñuales Larroy's partner, Lorenza Sarsa Hernández, managed to cross the Pyrenees, together with their daughter, Zeïka Sonia (born 22 November 1938). The Gestapo captured them but they were released years later through the intervention of Francisco Ponzán Vidal's resistance group.

References 

People from Somontano de Barbastro
1913 births
1939 deaths
Spanish anarchists
Spanish educational theorists
1939 suicides
Suicides by firearm in Spain
Joint suicides